The following are the national records in athletics in Gabon maintained by Gabon's national athletics federation: Fédération Gabonaise d'Athlétisme.

Outdoor

Key to tables:

+ = en route to a longer distance

h = hand timing

A = affected by altitude

Men

Women

Indoor

Men

Women

Notes

References
General
World Athletics Statistic Handbook 2019: National Outdoor Records
World Athletics Statistic Handbook 2018: National Indoor Records
Specific

External links

Gabon
Records
Athletics